Daniel Disney (1656–1734) of Swinderby, Lincolnshire, was an 18th-century English non-conformist landowner.

Life
Disney married 1674 Catherine Fynes (died 1690), younger daughter and co-heiress of Henry Fynes (1611–1670), whose father Sir Henry Fynes rebuilt Kirkstead Abbey as a country house in the 17th century. Thus the Disneys inherited the lordship of the manor of Kirkstead, Lincolnshire.

The father of Revd John Disney, great-grandfather of Revd Dr John Disney and great-great-grandfather of John Disney, High Sheriff of Dorset and former Recorder of Bridport, he founded a dissenting chapel and in 1720 he set up a trust to provide for continued dissenting worship in the manor after his death.

See also
 Kirkstead Abbey

References

1656 births
1734 deaths
English Dissenters
People from Lincolnshire
American families of British ancestry